Rowena Arshad  (born 27 April 1960) is Chair in Multicultural and Anti-Racist Education and Co-Director of the Centre for Education for Racial Equality in Scotland (CERES) Moray House School of Education and Sport at the University of Edinburgh. Her doctorate was an interpretive study of teacher activism in equity and anti-discrimination in Scotland and her ongoing research is into equity and anti-discrimination issues in education (school, community education and tertiary) and within educational policy.

Rowena was an Equal Opportunities Commissioner for Scotland 2001-2007. She sits on the Educational Broadcasting Commission Scotland. She was awarded her OBE in 2001 for services to race equality in Scotland  and her CBE for services to equality and education in 2019.  She chaired the Scottish government working group in November 2017 to look at increasing the number of teachers from under-represented minority groups at all levels in Scottish schools  She was a member of the Scottish Further and Higher Education Funding Council from 1999 -2009 and a board member on Her Majesty's Inspectorate for Education, the Scottish Committee of the Equality and Human Rights Commission and the  Scottish Government Independent Advisory Group on Hate Crime, Prejudice and Community Cohesion. She has an honorary doctorate from Edinburgh Napier University in 2010 for services to gender equality. Arshad retired from University of Edinburgh  and as Professor Emerita continues to comment on issues regarding race and education in Scotland.

References 

1960 births
Living people
Commanders of the Order of the British Empire
People associated with the University of Edinburgh